Nagesh Kukunoor (born 30 March 1967) is an Indian film director, producer, screenwriter and actor known for his works predominantly in Hindi cinema, and few Telugu language films. He is known for his works in parallel cinema, such as Hyderabad Blues (1998), Rockford  (1999), Iqbal (2005), Dor (2006), Aashayein (2010), Lakshmi (2014), and Dhanak (2016). Kukunoor has received seven International Awards, and two National Film Awards for his works.

In 2003, he directed 3 Deewarein, which was showcased among the Indian panorama section, at the 2003 International Film Festival of India. The film was also premiered at the Kolkata Film Festival. After having been screened at the Indian Film Festival of Los Angeles, where it was well received, the film was screened at the Commonwealth Festival at Manchester, it was nominated as one of the top five films, at the gala presentation. Nagesh Kukunoor has also received the Filmfare Award for Best Story.

In 2006, he garnered the National Film Award for Best Film on Other Social Issues, for directing Iqbal. In 2014, he received the Mercedes Benz Audience Award, for Best Narrative at the Palm Springs International Film Festival for Lakshmi. In 2015 he directed the road movie, Dhanak, which won the Crystal Bear Grand Prix for Best Children's Film, and Special Mention for the Best Feature Film by The Children's Jury for Generation Kplus at the 65th Berlin International Film Festival. The film has also garnered the Best Film Award in the main category-Children's Feature Film Competition-Cinema in Sneakers (film festival), and the Best Film Award – at the Montreal International Children's Film Festival (FIFEM). The film has garnered the National Film Award for Best Children's Film for 2016.

Early life
Nagesh Kukunoor was born in Hyderabad to Kusuma and Sudarshan. Kukunoor's mother tongue is Telugu, and as a child he loved watching Telugu, Hindi, and English films in the theatres of his neighbourhood, Narayanguda. He studied at Montfort School, Yercaud. Nagesh Kukunoor attended Osmania University in Hyderabad, India and received his bachelor's degree in Chemical Engineering. He moved to Atlanta, Georgia in the United States in 1988, and completed his master's degree in Environmental Engineering at Georgia Institute of Technology. After graduating from Georgia Tech, he went to work as an Environmental Consultant at Trinity Consultants in Texas, then in Atlanta, during which he attended workshops in film.  He studied Acting & direction at the Warehouse Actor's Theater in Atlanta.

Film career
He invested the money he made from his engineering career in USA in producing the 1998 movie Hyderabad Blues. It is based on a script that he wrote in Atlanta dealing with Indians returning home from the United States of America. He directed and acted in the movie. It had a budget of Rs. 1.7 million (roughly equivalent to US$40,000) and was shot in 17 days. It was perceived by Sanjay Arora, an independent film maker, to be realistic and one of the first movies to use Hyderabadi Urdu correctly. It became the most successful independent film in India. The film was featured at Peachtree International Film Festival in Atlanta and Rhode Island International Film Festival.

Later features
3 Deewarein (2003) was premiered at the Kolkata Film Festival.

In 2006, Nagesh Kukunoor wrote and directed Dor, a drama film featuring Ayesha Takia, Gul Panag and Shreyas Talpade as the lead actors. Nagesh also acted in the film, playing businessman Chopra. The film is about two women who come from different backgrounds and how fate brings them together. Meera (Ayesha Takia), a young woman who becomes a widow shortly after marriage, is trapped by tradition. Zeenat (Gul Panag), on the other hand, faces the daunting task of saving the life of her husband, who is on trial for murder. A bahuroopiya (Shreyas Talpade) helps her reach Meera, who holds the "string" to Zeenat's hope. The companionship that develops between Meera and Zeenat results in redemption for both. The film was well received by both the critics and film buffs.

It was, however, his film Iqbal featuring Shreyas Talpade and Naseeruddin Shah, which won him a lot of critical acclaim and recognition for the simple yet heart rending script by Nagesh and the acting by all actors.

His next film 8 x 10 Tasveer, an action-thriller featuring Akshay Kumar in the lead role fared poorly at the box office but was considered to be Nagesh's most self-reflective work to date. "I like to cast characters who are close to me. And this one gets as close to me as possible. I was once an environmental consultant. Akshay plays the part of an environment protection officer," Kukunoor said in an April 2009 interview.

In 2015, at the 65th Berlin International Film Festival, his feature Dhanak won The Grand Prix of the Generation Kplus International Jury for the best feature-length film, and received a Special Mention by Children's Jury in Generation Kplus Section.

Filmography

Films

Television

Awards
National Film Awards
 Best Film on Other Social Issues – Iqbal – 2006
 Best Children's Film – Dhanak – 2016

International Awards
 Audience Award for best film at the Peachtree International Film Festival in Atlanta, Georgia – Hyderabad Blues – 1999
 Audience Award for best film at the Rhode Island International Film Festival – Hyderabad Blues – 1999
 Best Film – Mercedes Benz Audience Award, for Best Narrative at the Palm Springs International Film Festival – Lakshmi – 2014
 Dhanak (2015)
 The Grand Prix, for the best feature-length film – at the 65th Berlin International Film Festival
 Special Mention for the Best Feature Film by The Children's Jury for Generation Kplus at the 65th Berlin International Film Festival
 Best Film Award in the main category-Children's Feature Film Competition-Cinema in Sneakers (film festival)
 Best Film Award – at the Montreal International Children's Film Festival (FIFEM)

Filmfare Awards
 Filmfare Award for Best Story – 3 Deewarein – 2004

Other Awards
 Teacher's Achievement Award for Creative and Performing Arts – 2002

References

External links
 

1967 births
Georgia Tech alumni
Male actors in Hindi cinema
Telugu male actors
Hindi-language film directors
Indian male film actors
Filmfare Awards winners
20th-century Indian film directors
Hindi film producers
Film producers from Hyderabad, India
Living people
Film directors from Hyderabad, India
21st-century Indian film directors
20th-century Indian male actors
21st-century Indian male actors
Screenwriters from Hyderabad, India
Male actors from Hyderabad, India
20th-century Indian dramatists and playwrights
21st-century Indian dramatists and playwrights
Directors who won the Best Children's Film National Film Award
Directors who won the Best Film on Other Social Issues National Film Award
Telugu film directors